is a Shinto shrine in the Ichinomiya neighborhood of the city of Shisō in Hyōgo Prefecture, Japan. It is the ichinomiya of former Harima Province. The main festival of the shrine is held annually on October 15.

Enshrined kami
The kami enshrined at Iwa Jinja are:

History
The origins of Iwa Jinja are uncertain. According to the Harima fudoki, it was during the reign of Emperor Seimu or Emperor Kinmei and takes its name from a syllable uttered by Ōkuninushi when he completed building the country. The shrine is listed in the early Heian period Engishiki and was then ichinomiya of the province from the end of the Heian period. Although destroyed periodically by fire, it has been rebuilt with the support of the Imperial Court, the Akamatsu clan and various feudal lords.

The Hitotsuyama Kofun, a Kofun period burial mound is located 400 meters to the southeast of the Iwa Shrine. It is a Hyōgo Prefectural Historic Site.

Gallery

See also
Ichinomiya

References

External links

Hyogo Jinjacho home page
Hyogo Tourism

Shinto shrines in Hyōgo Prefecture
Harima Province
Shisō, Hyōgo
Ichinomiya
Beppyo shrines